A mountain goat is a mammal species of the genus Oreamnos found in North America.

Mountain goat may also refer to:
 Altai Mountain goat, a breed of domestic goat
 Harrington's mountain goat, an extinct relative of the North American mountain goats
 Kinetic Mountain Goat, a small airplane
 The Mountain Goats, an American indie rock band
 Mountain Goat (bus company), a bus company in Cumbria, England
 Mountain Goat (motor cycle), a 1960s off-road New Zealand farm bike
 Mountain Goat Beer, an Australian microbrewery
 The Mountain Goats, a fictional college football team in Blue Mountain State
 Mountain Goats (TV series), 2015 British sitcom

See also
Goat Mountain (disambiguation)
Capra (genus), a genus of goats including the Eurasian mountain goats
Dahu, a legendary Alpine goat-like creature with left and right legs of different lengths
Tahr, a Himalayan ungulate